Alberto Camargo may refer to:

 Alberto Lleras Camargo (1906–1990), journalist, politician and President of Colombia
 Alberto Camargo (cyclist) (born 1967), Colombian racing cyclist